Statistics of Swiss Super League in the 1909–10 season.

East

Table 

Aarau qualified.

Central

Table 

Young Boys qualified.

West

Table 

Servette qualified.

Final

Table

Results 

|colspan="3" style="background-color:#D0D0D0" align=center|5 June 1910

|-
|colspan="3" style="background-color:#D0D0D0" align=center|12 June 1910

|-
|colspan="3" style="background-color:#D0D0D0" align=center|26 June 1910

|}

Young Boys Bern won the championship.

Sources 
 Switzerland 1909-10 at RSSSF

Seasons in Swiss football
Swiss Football League seasons
1909–10 in Swiss football
Swiss